The Vestries Act 1831, commonly known as Hobhouse's Vestry Act (named after the Whig frontbencher Sir John Hobhouse, later created Lord Broughton), was an Act of Parliament in 1831 and was a local government overhaul which also affected the Established Church at a local level.  The act gave subsidiarity in that local ratepayers would have to agree by a special majority for the reform to take effect in their local area (parish).

Where locally approved it replaced the Select Vestry (the local government where not an open vestry and which was in most cases a narrow oligarchy) with a non co-opted system of vestrymen (vestry members) to be instead elected by ratepayers (male and female) who had been resident in the parish for more than a year.

To adopt the act (reform) the parish had to have over 800 ratepayers (thus excluding almost all rural parishes), of whom at least  would need to vote in support of the reform.

The five metropolitan parishes to adopt the act were:
St George Hanover Square
St Marylebone
St Pancras
Westminster St James
Westminster St John

Membership of their vestries were replaced over a period of three years with a series of elections.

The Metropolis Management Act 1855 went further by abolishing the remaining select vestries of all metropolitan parishes in 1855 and extended the principle of election by ratepayers.

References

United Kingdom Acts of Parliament 1831